Verhulst is a Dutch toponymic surname. It is a contraction of "van der Hulst", meaning "from the (place where) holly (grows)". It may refer to:

 (1929–2002), Belgian historian, flamingant and freethinker
Alfred Verhulst (1921–1975), American Air Force general
Chris Verhulst (born 1966), American football player
Davino Verhulst (born 1987), Belgian football goalkeeper
Dimitri Verhulst (born 1972), Belgian writer
Frank Verhulst (born 1951), Dutch psychiatrist
Gert Verhulst (born 1968), Belgian actor, film director and television presenter
 (1921–2005), Dutch sculptor and graphic designer
Hobie Verhulst (born 1993), Dutch football goalkeeper
Johannes Verhulst (1816–1891), Dutch composer, conductor, and music administrator
Jos Verhulst (born 1949), Belgian chemist
Mayken Verhulst (1518–1599), Flemish painter
Pierre François Verhulst (1804–1849), Belgian mathematician
Verhulst equation and Verhulst diagram, named after him
 (1866–1941), Flemish poet and writer
Rombout Verhulst (1624–1698), Flemish sculptor
Stefaan Verhulst (born 1966),  American technology writer
Willem Verhulst (fl. 1625), second director of the Dutch West India Company

See also
Dossier Verhulst, Dutch television drama series

References

Dutch-language surnames
Toponymic surnames